Elections in Morocco are held on a national level for the legislature. Parliament has two chambers. The Assembly of Representatives of Morocco (Majlis AL-Nuwab/Assemblée des Répresentants) has 325 members elected for a five-year term, 295 elected in multi-seat constituencies and 30 in national lists consisting only of women. The Assembly of Councillors (Majlis al-Mustasharin) has 120 members, elected for a six-year term, elected by local councils (162 seats), professional chambers (91 seats) and wage-earners (27 seats).

Morocco has had a multi-party system since independence in 1955, with numerous parties in which no one party often has a chance of gaining power alone, and parties must work with each other to form coalition governments. Since Morocco considers Western Sahara as part of its territory and administers large parts of it, the elections are also held there.

2006 fraud affair
In October 2006, as many as 67 people were arrested for election fraud allegations related to the September 8, 2006 polls. Among them there were 17 lawmakers (12 from the Assembly of Councillors and 5 from the Assembly of Representatives). It was the first time the Moroccan government made such arrests.

Latest elections

See also
Elections in Western Sahara
Electoral calendar
Electoral system

External links
Adam Carr's Election Archive

References and sources